Jerry Bienvenido Gil Manzanillo (born October 14, 1982 in San Pedro de Macorís, Dominican Republic) is a Dominican professional baseball pitcher.

Gil played almost exclusively shortstop in the minor leagues until  when he became a utility player mostly playing in the outfield. On October 13, 2006, Gil was traded from the Diamondbacks to the Cincinnati Reds for Abe Woody. He missed all of  after having elbow ligament replacement surgery. In  after batting below the Mendoza Line in both Triple-A and Double-A, Gil was converted to a pitcher. He has a strong throwing arm and can throw his fastball up to 95 MPH. .

In November 2011, Gil signed a minor league contract with the Toronto Blue Jays.  According to the International League transactions page, Gil declared free agency on November 2, 2012.

On January 13, 2013 Gil signed a Minor League contract with the Cleveland Indians.

References

External links

1982 births
Living people
Arizona Diamondbacks players
Azucareros del Este players
Carolina Mudcats players
Chattanooga Lookouts players
Cincinnati Reds players
Columbus Clippers players
Dominican Republic expatriate baseball players in Canada
Dominican Republic expatriate baseball players in Mexico
Dominican Republic expatriate baseball players in the United States
Estrellas Orientales players
Gulf Coast Reds players
Lancaster JetHawks players
Las Vegas 51s players

Leones del Caracas players
Leones del Escogido players
Louisville Bats players
Major League Baseball players from the Dominican Republic
Major League Baseball shortstops
Mexican League baseball pitchers
Missoula Osprey players
Sportspeople from San Pedro de Macorís
Rojos del Águila de Veracruz players
Sarasota Reds players
South Bend Silver Hawks players
Tennessee Smokies players
Trois-Rivières Aigles players
Tucson Sidewinders players
Yakima Bears players
Dominican Republic expatriate baseball players in Venezuela